"...And the Bag's in the River" is the third episode of the first season of the American television drama series Breaking Bad. Written by Vince Gilligan and directed by Adam Bernstein, it aired on AMC in the United States and Canada on February 10, 2008.

Plot 
Walt and Jesse clean up the bloody remains of Emilio while Krazy-8 regains consciousness in the basement. While talking with Walt, Krazy-8 reveals that Jesse told him and Emilio about Walt's personal life. Walt then confronts Jesse, in the middle of getting high off meth, who berates him for not living up to his end of the bargain on the two and drives off. Meanwhile, Skyler tells Marie that she is working on a new short story with a stoner character in it, and she asks her about marijuana. Marie assumes that Skyler thinks Walt Jr. is smoking pot, but Skyler insists that she was just talking about her story. Marie asks Hank to scare Walt Jr. straight, leading him to bring Walt Jr. to a motel to show how meth has corroded the teeth of a prostitute.

Walt phones Skyler to apologize for being late, falsely claiming that he's working over at the car wash. Skyler informs Walt that she knows he quit his job there two weeks previously and angrily tells him to not come home. Walt weighs the pros and cons of killing Krazy-8, then collapses on the basement floor while bringing him a sandwich, shattering the plate. After he regains consciousness, Walt tells Krazy-8 he has lung cancer. After engaging in conversation with Krazy-8 and seemingly forming a bond with him, Walt decides to let him go free. Walt goes to get the key to the bike lock which is holding Krazy-8 captive. However, he realizes that there is a large shard missing from the broken plate, indicating that Krazy-8 obtained it while he was unconscious and plans to use it as a weapon. Walt reluctantly garrotes Krazy-8 with the bike lock while he stabs backward into Walt's leg with the broken plate. Walt goes back home to find Skyler sitting on the bed, crying. He says he has something to tell her.

Meanwhile, Hank and several DEA agents discover the cook site in the desert along with Krazy-8's car. Inside the car, they find the small bag of crystal meth cooked by Walt. The family of Native Americans shares the lab mask the young girl found in the previous episode.

Production 
The episode was written by Vince Gilligan, and directed by Adam Bernstein; it aired on AMC in the United States and Canada on February 10, 2008.

The episode title is a part of a line from the 1957 film Sweet Smell of Success, in which a character reports that he resolved an issue. It means that Walt kills Krazy-8.

J.J. Hunsecker: "That means you've got a plan. Can you deliver?"Sidney Falco: "Tonight, before you go to bed. The cat's in the bag and the bag's in the river."

Critical reception 
The episode received critical acclaim. Seth Amitin of IGN gave the episode a rating of 8.9 out of 10 commenting: "If you put every episode of every TV show in existence and rolled it up into one giant ball, we doubt you'd come out with anything as intense as that one minute of television where Walt killed Crazy-8." Donna Bowman of The A.V. Club gave the episode an "A−", saying: "All the heavy stuff I loved so much and described above -- yet this was also an episode full of hilarious lines."

In 2019, The Ringer ranked "...And the Bag's in the River" as the 10th best out of the 62 total Breaking Bad episodes. Vulture.com ranked it 22nd overall.

References

External links 
 "...And the Bag's in the River"  at the official Breaking Bad site
 

2008 American television episodes
Breaking Bad (season 1) episodes
Television episodes written by Vince Gilligan